Hout (also spelled Hut) is a village in southern Syria, administratively part of the al-Suwayda Governorate, located south of al-Suwayda. Nearby localities include Umm al-Rumman to the south, Samad to the southwest, Bosra to the west, Nimrah and al-Qurayya to the north and Salkhad to the east. According to the Syria Central Bureau of Statistics (CBS), Hout had a population of 873 in the 2004 census.

History
In 1596  Hout  appeared in the Ottoman tax registers as Huta and was part of the nahiya of Bani Malik as-Sadir in the Qada Hauran. It had an all  Muslim population consisting of 5 households and 2 bachelors. The villagers paid  a fixed tax rate of 20%  on wheat, barley, summer crops, goats and/or beehives, in addition to "occasional revenues" and a for a press for olive oil or grape syrup; a total of 3,180  akçe.

In 1838 Hut was noted as a "ruin or deserted", located in the Nukrah, south of Busrah.

References

Bibliography

External links
 Map of the town, Google Maps

Populated places in Salkhad District
Druze communities in Syria